Ras protein-specific guanine nucleotide-releasing factor 1 is a protein in humans that is encoded by the RASGRF1 gene.

The protein encoded by this gene is a guanine nucleotide exchange factor (GEF) similar to the Saccharomyces cerevisiae CDC25 gene product. Functional analysis has demonstrated that this protein stimulates the dissociation of GDP from RAS protein. 

The studies of the similar gene in mice suggested that the Ras-GEF activity of this protein in the brain can be activated by Ca2+ influx, muscarinic receptors, and G protein beta-gamma subunit. Mouse studies also indicated that the Ras-GEF signaling pathway mediated by this protein may be important for long-term memory. Alternatively spliced transcript variants encoding distinct isoforms have been reported. [provided by RefSeq, Mar 2009].

References

Further reading